"In the Future When All's Well" was the third single from the album Ringleader of the Tormentors by Morrissey. It was added to XFM London's playlist on 18 August 2006. It also made BBC Radio 2's C-List and BBC 6 Music's A-List. The single was released internationally on 21 August 2006. It peaked at number 17 on the UK Singles Chart.

Track listing
CD single 1
 "In the Future When All's Well" (Morrissey/Tobias)
 "Christian Dior" (Morrissey/Boorer)

CD single 2
 "In the Future When All's Well" (Morrissey/Tobias)
 "I'll Never Be Anybody's Hero Now" (Live at London Palladium) (Morrissey/Whyte)
 "To Me You Are a Work of Art" (Live at London Palladium) (Morrissey/Whyte)
 "In the Future When All's Well" (Video)

7"
 "In the Future When All's Well" (Morrissey/Tobias)
 "Christian Dior" (Morrissey/Boorer)

Musicians
 Morrissey: voice
 Boz Boorer: guitar
 Jesse Tobias: guitar
 Alain Whyte: guitar
 Gary Day: bass
 Michael Farrell: keyboard
 Matt Chamberlain: drums
 Matt Walker: drums (only on live tracks)

External links
 Official Single info
 Single info

Morrissey songs
2006 singles
Songs written by Morrissey
Songs written by Jesse Tobias
Song recordings produced by Tony Visconti
2005 songs
Sanctuary Records singles